Donald Chaffey (5 August 1917 – 13 November 1990) was a British film director, writer, producer, and art director.

Chaffey's film career began as an art director in 1947, and his directorial debut was in 1953.  He remained active in the industry until his death in 1990 from heart failure. His film Charley One-Eye (1973) was entered into the 24th Berlin International Film Festival.

He is chiefly remembered for his fantasy films, which include Jason and the Argonauts (1963), The Three Lives of Thomasina (1963), One Million Years B.C. (1966), The Viking Queen (1967), Creatures the World Forgot (1971), Pete's Dragon (1977), and C.H.O.M.P.S. (1979), his final feature film.

Concurrent with his theatrically released films, Chaffey directed episodes of numerous British television series, including multiple installments of Danger Man, The Prisoner, and The Avengers.  From the 1980s until his death, all of his work was in American made-for-TV movies, and in such TV series as Fantasy Island, Stingray, MacGyver, Vega$, T. J. Hooker, Matt Houston, and Charlie's Angels.

Career
Chaffey began his career in the art department of Gainsborough Productions where he worked as a draftsman on Madonna of the Seven Moons (1945), The Rake's Progress (1945), and Caravan (1946). He was art director of The Adventures of Dusty Bates (1947) and The Little Ballerina (1948). He directed the documentary shorts Thames Tideway (1948) and Cape Cargoes (1948).

Chaffey directed the short features The Mysterious Poacher (1950) and The Case of the Missing Scene (1950). He returned to the art department for King of the Underworld (1950), The Stolen Plans (1952), Murder at the Grange (1952), Murder at Scotland Yard (1952), and Black 13 (1953).

Director
Chaffey resumed his directing career with the family film Skid Kids (1953). He made the short Watch Out (1953), then did Strange Stories (1953), Bouncer Breaks Up (1953, a short), The Mask (1952), and A Good Pull Up (1953).

Chaffey directed Time Is My Enemy (1954). After the short Dead on Time (1955) he made The Secret Tent (1956), The Flesh Is Weak (1957) and The Girl in the Picture (1957). He also directed "The Man Upstairs" (1958) starring Richard Attenborough.
  
He directed episodes of TV series like Theatre Royal, The Adventures of the Big Man, Chevron Hall of Stars, The Errol Flynn Theatre, Assignment Foreign Legion, The Adventures of Robin Hood, Dial 999, and The New Adventures of Charlie Chan. He interspersed these with features like A Question of Adultery (1958), The Man Upstairs (1958), Danger Within (1959), Dentist in the Chair (1960), Lies My Father Told Me (1960), and Nearly a Nasty Accident (1961).

Disney and Fantasy
He did Greyfriars Bobby: The True Story of a Dog (1961) then A Matter of WHO (1961), a version of The Prince and the Pauper (1962) for Disney, and The Webster Boy (1962).

He had a big hit with Jason and the Argonauts (1963) with Ray Harryhausen. Then it was back to Disney for The Three Lives of Thomasina (1963).

Chaffey directed They All Died Laughing (1964), The Crooked Road (1965), and One Million Years B.C. (1966) for Hammer. He returned to television to do episodes of Danger Man, The Baron, The Prisoner, Man in a Suitcase, Journey to the Unknown, The Avengers, The Pathfinders, and The Protectors.

Chaffey did The Viking Queen (1967) for Hammer, A Twist of Sand (1968), Creatures the World Forgot (1971) for Hammer, Clinic Exclusive (1973), Charley-One-Eye (1973), and Persecution (1974).

Australia and US TV
Chaffey went to Australia where he directed Ben Hall (1975), Ride a Wild Pony (1975), The Fourth Wish (1976), and Shimmering Light (1978).

He worked in America too making CHiPs, Pete's Dragon (1977) for Disney, The Magic of Lassie (1978), Lassie: A New Beginning (1978), The Gift of Love (1978), C.H.O.M.P.S. (1979), and Casino (1980).

He eventually focused almost exclusively on episodic TV: Vega$, Charlie's Angels, Strike Force, Fantasy Island, Gavilan, The Renegade, Lottery!, Hotel, Matt Houston, Finder of Lost Loves, International Airport (1985, a pilot), Spenser: For Hire, Hollywood Beat, Airwolf, Hunter, Outlaws, MacGyver, Stingray and Mission: Impossible.

Personal life
Chaffey married American actress Paula Kelly in 1985 and they had one child together. Chaffey died of a heart attack in 1990.

Filmography

Film

1953: Strange Stories ("Strange Journey" segment)
1953: Skid Kids
1954: Time Is My Enemy
1956: The Secret Tent
1957: The Girl in the Picture
1957: The Flesh Is Weak
1958: A Question of Adultery
1958: The Man Upstairs
1959: Danger Within
1960: Lies My Father Told Me
1960: Dentist in the Chair
1961: Nearly a Nasty Accident
1961: Greyfriars Bobby
1961: A Matter of WHO
1962: The Webster Boy
1963: Jason and the Argonauts
1963: The Three Lives of Thomasina
1964: A Jolly Bad Fellow
1965: The Crooked Road
1966: One Million Years B.C.
1967: The Viking Queen
1968: A Twist of Sand
1971: Clinic Exclusive
1971: Creatures the World Forgot
1973: Charley One-Eye
1974: Persecution
1975: Ride a Wild Pony
1976: The Fourth Wish
1977: Pete's Dragon
1978: The Magic of Lassie
1979: C.H.O.M.P.S. (final theatrical film)

Television

1955–56: Theatre Royal (TV series; 16 episodes)
1956: The Adventures of the Big Man (TV series; 2 episodes)
1956: Chevron Hall of Stars (TV series; 1 episode)
1956–57: Assignment Foreign Legion (TV series; 7 episodes)
1957: The Errol Flynn Theatre (TV series; 2 episodes)
1957–58: The New Adventures of Charlie Chan (TV series; 13 episodes)
1957–58: The Adventures of Robin Hood (TV series; 7 episodes)
1959–60: The Four Just Men (TV series; 13 episodes)
1959: Dial 999 (TV series; 1 episode)
1962–65: Walt Disney's Wonderful World of Color (TV series; 10 episodes)
1964–66: Danger Man (TV series; 15 episodes)
1966–67: The Baron (TV series; 2 episodes)
1967: The Prisoner (TV series; 4 episodes)
1968: Man in a Suitcase (TV series; 1 episode)
1968–69: Journey to the Unknown (TV series; 2 episodes)
1968–69: The Avengers (TV series; 5 episodes)
1970: Journey to the Unknown (TV movie; "The Last Visitor" segment)
1972: The Pathfinders (TV series; 2 episodes)
1972–73: The Protectors (TV series; 9 episodes)
1975: Ben Hall (TV series; 1 episode)
1977: Born to Run (TV movie)
1977: CHiPs (TV series; 1 episode)
1978–81: Vega$ (TV series; 17 episodes)
1978–81: Charlie's Angels (TV series; 10 episodes)
1978: Lassie: A New Beginning (TV movie)
1978: The Gift of Love (TV movie)
1978: Shimmering Light (TV movie)
1979: The Wonderful World of Disney (TV series; 4 episodes)
1980: Casino (TV movie)
1980: Riding for the Pony Express (TV pilot episode)
1981–82: Fantasy Island (TV series; 7 episodes)
1982: Strike Force (TV series; 4 episodes)
1982: Gavilan (TV series; 1 episode)
1982–83: T. J. Hooker (TV series; 6 episodes)
1982–84: Matt Houston (TV series; 12 episodes)
1983: The Renegades (TV series; 1 episode)
1983: Lottery! (TV series; 1 episode)
1983: Hotel (TV series; 2 episodes)
1984–85: Finder of Lost Loves (TV series; 6 episodes)
1985: Hollywood Beat (TV series; 4 episodes)
1985: International Airport (TV movie)
1985: Spenser: For Hire (TV series; 1 episode)
1986: Airwolf (TV series; 1 episode)
1986: Hunter (TV series; 1 episode)
1986–87: MacGyver (TV series; 2 episodes)
1987: Outlaws (TV series; 1 episode)
1987: Stingray (TV series; 2 episodes)
1989: Mission: Impossible (TV series; 4 episodes)

References

External links
 
 
 

1917 births
1990 deaths
People from Hastings
English art directors
English film directors
English film producers
English male screenwriters
English television directors
Fantasy film directors
20th-century English screenwriters
20th-century English male writers
20th-century English businesspeople